The Kenton Commercial Historic District is a historic district in north Portland, Oregon's Kenton neighborhood, in the United States. The district is listed on the National Register of Historic Places.

Description
Kenton's principal commercial district is located on North Denver Avenue, extending roughly four blocks south from North Interstate Avenue, where the Paul Bunyan statue stands.  The district was developed mainly between 1910 and 1949, and contains an unusually high concentration of buildings constructed using ornamental concrete blocks.  The area developed directly as an outgrowth of Swift & Company's decision to run a streetcar line along the street from its stockyards to the rest of the Portland streetcar network.  The district was listed on the National Register of Historic Places in 2001 for its role in the development of the neighborhood and the city.

Properties
Contributing and noncontributing properties include:

 Bingham Building
 Cassady Building
 Chaldean Theater
 Coulter Building
 Dupey Building
 First National Bank of Portland Livestock Kenton Branch
 Goldstein Building
 Hobbs Building
 Johnson Building
 Kenton Bank Building
 Kenton Club
 Kenton Garage
 Kenton Hotel
 Kenton Lodge
 Kenyon Building
 Mackin and Son
 McArthur Hotel
 Rosin Building
 Smith Building
 Stafford & Frank Building
 Strocheker Building
 Sylvester Building

See also

 National Register of Historic Places listings in North Portland, Oregon

References

External links
 

Historic districts on the National Register of Historic Places in Oregon
Kenton, Portland, Oregon
National Register of Historic Places in Portland, Oregon